Barbara Gibbs (September 23, 1912 – August 13, 1993) was an American poet and translator.

Life
Gibbs was born in Los Angeles, California, and attended Stanford University and U.C.L.A.  She was married to the poet J. V. Cunningham from 1937 to 1945, and, later, to Francis Golffing.  She was a 1955 Guggenheim Fellow.

Her work appeared in Poetry, The New Yorker, The Nation,
and the Hudson Review.

Works
The well: poems, A. Swallow, 1941
The green chapel, Noonday Press, 1958
Poems written in Berlin, Claude Fredericks, 1959
The meeting place of the colors: poems, Cummington Press, 1972
Francis Golffing, Barbara Gibbs, Possibility: an essay in utopian vision, P. Lang, 1991, 
"Some Feminist Literary Criticism and a Theory", The Journal of Pre-Raphaelite Studies, November 1985

Translations

Paul Valéry, Le cimetière marin

References

External links
"Bulletin Baudelairien", 1968
Barbara Gibbs poetry in The New Yorker

1912 births
1993 deaths
American women poets
French–English translators
20th-century American poets
20th-century American women writers
20th-century American translators
Stanford University alumni
University of California, Los Angeles alumni